C. spectabilis may refer to:

Carex spectabilis, a sedge species
Cattleya pumila, an orchid species
Celeus spectabilis, the rufous-headed woodpecker, a bird species
Celmisia spectabilis, a flowering plant species
Chionothremma spectabilis, a moth species
Chrysolopus spectabilis, a weevil species
Corolla spectabilis, a sea butterfly species
Costus spectabilis, a plant species

Synonyms
Callichroma spectabilis, a synonym of Callichroma velutinum, a beetle species
Cosmos spectabilis, a synonym of Cosmos bipinnatus, a flowering plant species